Pilcher Pond is a lake in the U.S. state of Georgia.

Pilcher Pond was named after Samuel Pilcher, a pioneer citizen.

References

Landforms of McIntosh County, Georgia
Lakes of Georgia (U.S. state)